Stjepan Perestegi (born 20 August 1973) is a Croatian slalom canoeist who competed in the early to mid-1990s. He won a silver medal in the C-1 team event at the 1995 ICF Canoe Slalom World Championships in Nottingham.

Perestegi also finished 23rd in the C-1 event at the 1992 Summer Olympics in Barcelona.

References

Sports-reference.com profile

1973 births
Canoeists at the 1992 Summer Olympics
Croatian male canoeists
Living people
Olympic canoeists of Croatia
Medalists at the ICF Canoe Slalom World Championships